Kostiantyn Mykolaiovych "Konstantin" Simchuk (born February 26, 1974) is a former Ukrainian professional ice hockey goaltender. He was named best goaltender at the B Pool of the 1994 World Junior Ice Hockey Championships held in Bucharest, Romania. Now retired from his professional career, he focuses on coaching.

External links 

1974 births
Bakersfield Condors (1998–2015) players
Chevaliers of the Order of Merit (Ukraine)
Fort Wayne Komets players
HC Budivelnyk players
HC CSKA Moscow players
HC Sibir Novosibirsk players
HC Spartak Moscow players
Ice hockey players at the 2002 Winter Olympics
Knoxville Speed players
Las Vegas Coyotes players
Las Vegas Thunder players
Living people
Metallurg Magnitogorsk players
Olympic ice hockey players of Ukraine
Port Huron Border Cats players
Salavat Yulaev Ufa players
San Diego Gulls (WCHL) players
Sokil Kyiv players
Sportspeople from Kyiv
Tacoma Sabercats players
Ukrainian ice hockey goaltenders
Ukrainian expatriate sportspeople in the United States